The 2007 Hong Kong Sevens was a rugby sevens tournament held on 30 March until 1 April 2007 in Hong Kong at the 40,000 capacity Hong Kong Stadium. The event, the fifth leg of the 2006-07 IRB Sevens World Series, was won by Samoa.

The Format 
The Hong Kong Sevens is unique among the IRB Sevens events in several ways.

First, because 24 teams compete instead of the 16 that compete in all other series events, the Hong Kong Sevens is divided into six pools instead of the normal four.

Also because of the expanded number of teams, the points system for this tournament is also different. Most significantly, the winning team picks up 30 points instead of the normal 20, and the runner-up earns 24 points instead of the normal 16.

Finally, only three trophies are awarded instead of the four in a normal IRB Sevens event. The Shield is not awarded, leaving the Bowl, Plate, and Cup. Teams are assigned to the knockout tournaments for each trophy as follows:
Cup — The six pool winners, plus the two top-rated second-place teams
Plate — The four remaining second-place teams, plus the four top-rated third-place teams
Bowl — The eight remaining teams

Each of the top four seeds won an IRB Sevens World Series event in the 2006-07 season, with defending Hong Kong champions England out to capture a first Cup title of the season.

Ticket 
The public ticket sale for the Hong Kong Sevens 2007 was held in December 2006 at the Hong Kong Stadium. Hong Kong residents enjoyed the opportunity to purchase tickets for the event with the launch of the HKRFU’s local ticket campaign in October 2006, tickets sold through Hong Kong rugby clubs and other rugby stakeholders, sponsors and long-term event patrons in Hong Kong. This most recent public sale marked the final opportunity for local spectators to secure their tickets for the event.

The tournament

Pool stages

Pool A 

|width=10| 
|Results
 Fiji 45 - 0 Sri Lanka	 
 Scotland 31 - 7 Portugal
 Scotland 53 - 21 Sri Lanka	 
 Fiji 28 - 7 Portugal
 Portugal 47 - 7 Sri Lanka	 
 Fiji 26 - 0 Scotland
|}

Pool B

|width=10| 
|Results
 South Africa 59 - 0 Chinese Taipei	 
 Wales 7 - 33 Tonga
 Wales 61 - 0 Chinese Taipei	 
 South Africa 31 - 12 Tonga
 Tonga 49 - 17 Chinese Taipei	 
 South Africa 31 - 0 Wales
|}

Pool C

|width=10| 
|Results
 Samoa 49 - 5 China
 Canada 26 - 5 Japan
 Canada 19 - 21 China
 Samoa 54 - 7 Japan
 Japan 40 - 12 China	 
 Samoa 41 - 0 Canada
|}

Pool D

|width=10| 
|Results
 New Zealand 41 - 5 Italy	 
 Kenya 14 - 10 Russia
 Kenya 5 - 19 Italy	 
 New Zealand 54 - 0 Russia
 Russia 17 - 12 Italy	 
 New Zealand 50 - 14 Kenya
|}

Pool E

|width=10| 
|Results
 England 38 - 7 Hong Kong	 
 Argentina 24 - 14 Korea
 Argentina 19 - 12 Hong Kong	 
 England 38 - 14 Korea
 Korea 12 - 19 Hong Kong	 
 England 19 - 14 Argentina
|}

Pool F

|width=10| 
|Results
 France 5 - 14 USA	 
 Australia 19 - 12 Tunisia
 Australia 15 - 14 USA	 
 France 12 - 21 Tunisia
 Tunisia 5 - 14 USA	 
 France 14 - 28 Australia
|}

Finals

Bowl

Plate

Cup

Round 5 table

See also
Hong Kong Sevens
IRB Sevens World Series

External links
Hong Kong Sevens Profile on UR7s.com
Hong Kong Rugby Sevens Coverage
History of the Hong Kong Sevens

2007
rugby union
2006–07 IRB Sevens World Series
2007 in Asian rugby union
March 2007 sports events in Asia
April 2007 sports events in Asia